Bulletproof is the third studio album by Canadian country music artist Julian Austin. It was released by Civilian Records on August 13, 2002. "Pussycat," "I'm So Over You" and "Only God Knows" were released as singles.

Track listing
"Pussycat" (Julian Austin, Stephen Robichaud) – 2:59
"Ain't Taking It That Bad" (Austin, Myles Goodwyn, Robichaud) – 3:24
"When Did You?" (Austin, Robichaud) – 3:21
"I'm So Over You" (Austin, Goodwyn, Robichaud) – 2:35
"Ain't No Changing That" (Austin, Robichaud) – 3:31
"Finding Me" (Austin) – 4:08
"Bar Up in Houston" (Austin, Robichaud) – 2:16
"Only God Knows" (Austin, Robichaud) – 3:51
"End of the Line" (Austin, Robichaud) – 3:57
"Sweet Marina" (Austin, Goodwyn, Robichaud) – 3:26
"She's Getting Lonely" (Austin, Goodwyn) – 4:31
"Workin' Man's Society" (Austin, Daniel LeBlanc) – 3:03

External links
[ Bulletproof] at Allmusic

2002 albums
Julian Austin (musician) albums
Albums produced by Myles Goodwyn